Sisters of Fortune may refer to:

Sisters of Fortune, 2007 novel by Frances McNeil
Sisters of Fortune, America’s Caton Sisters at Home and Abroad, 2010 history book by Jehanne Wake